The Botanic Gardens Garage is a two-story, five-bay  Category A-listed building in the West End of Glasgow, Scotland. It is located on Vinicombe Street, a one-minute-walk from the Glasgow Botanic Gardens. It is the oldest surviving purpose-built motor garage in Glasgow. The building is no longer used as a garage, and instead houses restaurants and a gym.

History
David V. Wyllie was the architect and it was built between 1906 and 1912. In the 1920s the proprietor was Alexander Kennedy.

The building has been owned by Arnold Clark since the 1960s. It became vacant in 2006 and the owners initially planned to demolish it. In December 2007 the building was designated a category A listed building. The owners then looked to convert it for residential, retail and other commercial use. The decision was referred to Scottish Government ministers for the final approval. The company withdrew their plans to demolish the building and in 2014 a planning application was granted to convert it into a gym. Work was suspended in December 2016 when a wall collapsed on three workmen.

References

External links
 on CANMORE
Save The Botanic Gardens Garage

Ka Pao

Category A listed buildings in Glasgow
Commercial buildings completed in 1912